Ike Whittaker (born 13 August 1935) is  a former Australian rules footballer who played with Footscray in the Victorian Football League (VFL).

Notes

External links 
		

Living people
1935 births
Australian rules footballers from Western Australia
Western Bulldogs players
West Perth Football Club players